

Ecgwulf (or Eggwulf; died between 766 and 772) was a medieval Bishop of London.

Ecgwulf was consecrated in 745. He died between 766 and 772.

Citations

References

External links
 

Bishops of London
8th-century deaths
Year of birth unknown
8th-century English bishops